Sphenomorphus schultzei is a species of skink, a lizard in the family Scincidae. The species is endemic to Oceania.

Etymology
The specific name, schultzei, is in honor of German ethnographer Leonhard Schultze-Jena.

The specific name of the junior synonym, beauforti, is in honor of Dutch zoologist Lieven Ferdinand de Beaufort.

Geographic range
S. schultzei is found in Indonesia and Papua New Guinea.

Habitat

Description
S. schultzei is dark brown dorsally, and light brown ventrally.

Reproduction
S. schultzei is oviparous.

References

Further reading
de Jong (1927). "Reptiles from Dutch New Guinea". Nova Guinea 15 (3): 296–318. (Lygosoma beauforti, new species).
Vogt T (1911). "Reptilien und Amphibien aus Neu-Guinea". Sitzungsberichte der Gesellschaft Naturforschender Freunde zu Berlin 1911: 410–420. (Lygosoma schultzei, new species, pp. 416–417). (in German).

schultzei
Reptiles described in 1911
Taxa named by Theodor Vogt
Skinks of New Guinea